Auteg Motorsport is a motorsport storage, servicing and track car rental company specifically targeted towards drivers of the Nürburgring. Auteg Motorsport was founded in November 2005 by Jamie Martin and was originally based in Wimbach Germany with an administrational operation in Reading UK.

Auteg Motorsport is currently based 400 meters from the Nürburgring entrance in Nürburg and still has its administrational offices in Reading UK.

Auteg Motorsport is also a race team that races in the UK and Germany.

History

Auteg Motorsport won its first VLN race on Saturday 5 November 2005 in an endurance race specification Golf MK2. The team consisted of Jamie martin (Company Director & Driver), Manfred Scheer (Team Manager), Colin Hays (Driver) and 5 other German engineers.

Since 2005 the team structure has changed. Jamie Martin and Colin Hays are now the main drivers and the pit crew is managed by RSR Nürburg for the VLN race series and in the UK Warringtons of Warwick provide mechanical support for the Golf GTi race series. Marketing and Business development is managed by Glen Richardson who is a company Director.

Storage

In February 2008 Auteg Motorsport moved from its workshop and storage unit in Wimbach to Nürburg with RSR Nürburg. Previously the storage was low cost and the security wasn't high. Auteg now have indoor and outdoor secured storage which is 400 meters form the Nürburgring entrance.

Products

Auteg Motorsport also have a range of Nürburgring specific products developed by different manufacturers. These include Nordschleife tuned suspension by Avo Suspension and dry sump systems by Pace Products.

See also

List of auto racing tracks
List of Formula One circuits
24 Hours Nürburgring
Nordschleife fastest lap times

References

Motorsport in Germany